Albert Jean Louis Ayat (7 March 1875 – 2 December 1935) was a French fencer. He competed at the 1900 Summer Olympics alongside his brother Félix and won gold medals in the masters and amateur masters épée events.

References

External links

External link

1875 births
1935 deaths
French male épée fencers
Olympic gold medalists for France
Olympic fencers of France
Fencers at the 1900 Summer Olympics
Place of birth missing
Olympic medalists in fencing
Medalists at the 1900 Summer Olympics
21st-century French people